The Västerås Open was a golf tournament on the Swedish Golf Tour that featured on the Challenge Tour 1990–1994. It was played in Västerås, Sweden.

The Kentab Open was first played as an amateur tournament at Västerås GC in 1978, and it was added to the Swedish Golf Tour in 1986. Starting in 1998 the tournament began rotating between Västerås GC, Frösåker G&CC, Ängsö GC and Fullerö GC. In 2007 Västerås Municipality became the main sponsor and it was rebranded the Västerås Mälarstaden Open.

A similarly named event, the Kentab/RBG Open, sponsored name of the 1996 Swedish PGA Championship, was played at Frösåker G&CC and featured on the 1996 Challenge Tour.

Vilhelm Forsbrand, Joakim Rask and Peter Hanson have all won the tournament twice, Hanson while still an amateur.

Winners

Notes

References

External links
Coverage on the Challenge Tour's official site

Former Challenge Tour events
Swedish Golf Tour events
Golf tournaments in Sweden